Jithin Madathil Subran (born 16 January 1998) often called as Jithin MS, is an Indian professional footballer who plays as a forward for NorthEast United in the Indian Super League.

Club career
Jithin studied in Sree Kerala Varma College , Thrissur.The attacker has represented Kerala football team in Santosh Trophy.

FC Kerala
Jithin MS started his career with F.C. Kerala in 2016.

Kerala Blasters
After a successful campaign in Kerala Premier League. Jithin MS was signed by Kerala Blasters FC by paying a transfer fee to F.C. Kerala. He was loaned to Ozone F.C. in 2018.

Gokulam Kerala
Gokulam Kerala signed Jithin MS on free transfer from Kerala Blasters FC in 2019. On 9 January 2021, Jithin made his first appearance for Gokulam Kerala FC as a 74th minute substitute. In the 2021–22 I-League season, he scored a goal against Real Kashmir in their 5–1 win.

At the 2022 AFC Cup group-stage opener, Jithin MS and his side achieved a historic 4–2 win against Indian Super League side ATK Mohun Bagan, in which he scored a goal.

NorthEast United
On 18 August 2022, Jithin Joined NorthEast United on a 3 years deal. He made his debut for the club on 2 September against Sudeva Delhi, coming on as a 61st minute substitute for Sandeep Thapa and NorthEast United won the match in 2-0 scoreline.

Career statistics

Club

Honours
Kerala football team
 Santosh Trophy: 2017–18
Gokulam Kerala
 I-League: 2020–21, 2021–22

References

Living people
1998 births
Indian footballers
Footballers from Thrissur
Kerala Blasters FC players
Gokulam Kerala FC players
 NorthEast United FC players
Association football forwards
 I-League players
I-League 2nd Division players
Ozone FC players
Kerala Blasters FC Reserves and Academy players